Polezhayevo is a rural locality (a village) in Sizemskoye Rural Settlement, Sheksninsky District, Vologda Oblast, Russia. The population was 29 as of 2002.

Geography 
Polezhayevo is located 50 km northeast of Sheksna (the district's administrative centre) by road. Medvezhye is the nearest rural locality.

References 

Rural localities in Sheksninsky District